The Gin Bongo is a South Korean two-place paraglider that was designed by Gin Seok Song and produced by Gin Gliders of Yongin. It is now out of production.

Design and development
The Bongo was designed as a tandem glider for flight training and as such was referred to as the Bongo Tandem, indicating that it is a two seater.

The glider is DHV 1-2 Bi-Place certified.

Specifications (Bongo)

References

Bongo
Paragliders